The David di Donatello Award for Best Actress is a film award presented annually by the Accademia del Cinema Italiano (ACI, Academy of Italian Cinema) to recognize the outstanding performance in a leading role of an actress who has worked within the Italian film industry during the year preceding the ceremony. Nominees and winner are selected via run-off voting by all the members of the Accademia.

The award was first given in 1956. Sophia Loren is the record holder in this category, with seven awards, followed by Margherita Buy and Monica Vitti, with five awards each.

Winners and nominees
Below, winners are listed first in the colored row, followed by other nominees.

1950s

1960s

1970s

1980s

1990s

2000s

2010s

2020s

See also
 Nastro d'Argento for Best Actress
 European Film Award for Best Actress
 Academy Award for Best Actress
 BAFTA Award for Best Actress
 César Award for Best Actress
 Goya Award for Best Actress
 Lumières Award for Best Actress
 Cinema of Italy

References

External links
 
 Daviddidonatello.it (official website)

David di Donatello
Film awards for lead actress